Chris Duval (born 3 August 1983) is a former Australian cricketer, who played for South Australia and Tasmania. He was a fast bowler who generated enough pace to have interested scouts from American baseball outfit Los Angeles Dodgers. Duval transferred to Tasmania from South Australia in 2006 in an effort to boost the fast-bowling attack following a series of injuries. He later transferred back to South Australia where he became a regular player until he was dropped after the 2010–11 season.

References

1983 births
Living people
Australian cricketers
Tasmania cricketers
South Australia cricketers
Cricketers from South Australia